Muhammed Hakeem Mahoney born in Gambia, also known professionally as Gambino Akuboy, is an Afrobeats singer & songwriter, actor and screenwriter. Born in the Gambia, he now lives in the UK. Muhammed H. Mahoney is known for acting and film script writing, he has written for Gambia national TV. In 2016 he won the Best Music Video at the Wah Sa Halat Music Awards in The Gambia and his music is frequently played on BBC radio. Muhammed H Mahoney together with Ousman Jarju founded RebelVZN, an independent multimedia production company, that produced short films like MEBET.

Early life and acting / screenwriter career 
Muhammed Hakeem Mahoney was born in Banjul, capital of the Gambia. As a teenager he started his career as an Actor and played several lead roles. Movies he starred in were also aired on Gambia's National Television. In 2006 Muhammed H. Mahoney wrote the film "Calabash".

British Army / music career / film industry 
After traveling to the UK to study multimedia, Muhammed H. Mahoney joined the British Army for eight years. In the summer of 2013 he was posted to Kenya, where he met the Kenyan rapper Chieftain, with whom he recorded his first song. In 2015 he left the army to start his music career and to continue his work in the Film industry.

At the start of 2016, Gambino Akuboy released the song Dancefloor on which he featured Saint Da Gambian, known well in the Gambian rapping circles. The video was produced by David Nicol-Sey and adjudged Best Music Video at the Gambian Wah Sa Halat Music Awards. In December 2016, Gambino Akuboy released the song ‘Wish You Well’ with a video shot by Enos Olik in Kenya.

Music releases 
During 2017 Gambino Akuboy released several songs including: Chameleonfeaturing Sati (Kenyan Singer), What A Bum Bumfeaturing MLK (Gambian Rapper) and Tsunami. In October 2017 the song Worry Them, a collaboration with the London rappers Yun Kilz and Uncle Bimz, was released with a video published on GRM.

2018 was the year Gambino Akuboy released further singles like the Dancehall song Kolo, featuring ENC, which was aired on BBC Introducing and 6 Music, African Baby, and The Ding Dong Song – NG10 is Calling, which also aired on BBC Introducing. The single No Man No Cry featuring Uncle Bimz and Yun Kilz, produced by Killmatic, one of R2Bees beat-makers is from 2018.

Shining Star was Gambino Akuboy's first releases of 2019, it also aired on BBC Introducing. In 2019 he released Party Alien and Ready to Go.

One of his 2020 singles released in the spring of that year is called Corona which featured Uncle Bimz and S.Kay.

Selected discography

References

External links 

1985 births
Living people
Gambian singers
Gambian emigrants to the United Kingdom
British Army soldiers